The  Superior Court of California, County of Tuolumne, also known as the Tuolumne County Superior Court, is the branch of the California superior court with jurisdiction over Tuolumne County.

History
Tuolumne County was one of the original counties formed in 1850 when California became a state.

The first courthouse was a two-story wooden building completed in 1853 at the site of the present historic courthouse, 41 West Yaney Avenue. A replacement courthouse was completed in Spring 1900, designed by the architectural firm of William Mooser and Son. Local legend states the new courthouse was originally designed to face Washington Street, but locally prominent citizen Samuel S. Bradford had the plans altered to face his house, across Yaney Avenue. The 1900 courthouse was listed on the National Register of Historic Places in 1981.

A new Tuolumne County Law and Justice Center began construction in October 2019 to consolidate the two existing locations, with completion scheduled for May 2021. Lionakis is the credited architectural firm and construction administrator; it will be built incorporating locally sourced materials.

Venues
Tuolumne County Superior Court holds cases at the historic courthouse (for civil, family, probate, small claims, and juvenile cases) or the Washington Street facility (for criminal, traffic, and jury cases); both venues are close together in the county seat of Sonora, California.

References

External links
 
 

Superior Court
Superior courts in California